Graham Ball may refer to:

Graham Ball (presenter) (born 1938), English television personality known as Johnny Ball
Graham Ball, candidate in Ottawa-Carleton Regional Municipality elections, 1994